Ariel  are a "VIA" (pop/rock) band based in Chelyabinsk, Russia.
They were formed in 1970 and headed by  Valery Yarushin. From 1989 to the present day, they have been headed by Rostislav Gepp. The group emerged from a fusion of two earlier (1960s) ensembles, called Ariel and Allegro. Yarushin, who had been in charge of Allegro, became the manager of the new group. 
The band was popular during the Soviet era and won several awards. Their performances often made use of material of Russian folk music.

Plot
The vocal-instrumental ensemble "Ariel" was created by student of the Chelyabinsk Music College Lyv Fidelman in 1968. In early 1968, at the New Year's Eve, the first performance of the ensemble took place (at that time there was no name). It did not last long, as the director of the music school demanded that he stop it (only three songs were able to be sung). In 1968, there was a line-up that could give concerts. There was also a name. They did mostly cover versions of songs by The Beatles, The Monkees, The Tremeloes, The Turtles.

In 1970, at the initiative of the Komsomol District Committee of the Central District of the city of Chelyabinsk, three leading vocal and instrumental ensembles were invited to the creative meeting: Ariel, Allegro and Pilgrims. "Pilgrims" refused to attend the meeting, but a kind of creative competition took place among the ensembles "Ariel" and "Allegro", as a result of which only Ariel was created from two Chelyabinsk ensembles "Ariel" and "Allegro" (led by Valery Yarushin) Valery Yarushin was the leader of the band. The date of the formation of the ensemble was decided on November 7, 1970.

In December 1971, Ariel shared the first place with the Skomorokhi trio under the direction of Alexander Gradsky, at the Silver Strings competition, dedicated to the 750th anniversary of the city of Gorky.

"Ariel" is a laureate of the 5th All-Union Contest of Variety Artists (Moscow, 1974, first place).

"Ariel" performed at the Tbilisi Rock Festival out of competition in 1980.

The group often references Russian folklore. Some of their most famous songs: "Porushka — poranya", "Baba Yaga". On the account of "Ariel" - a number of conceptual stage productions, rock operas, including: "For the Russian Land", "Masters", "The Legend of Emelian Pugachev."

At different times, "Ariel" worked in different styles, but the genre base of the ensemble was always a Russian variant of folk-rock, implying the processing or stylization of popular Russian folk songs. Often the ensemble performs songs and a cappella ("Shumel kamysh") or accompanied by acoustic instruments.

Members

"Golden" formation of VIA "Ariel"

Valery Yarushin - bass guitar, accordion, vocals, arrangement - leader (from November 7, 1970 to 1989)
Lev Gurov † - rhythm guitar, vocals.
Boris Kaplun - drums, violin, vocal
Rostislav Gepp - piano, flute, vocal
Sergei Sharikov - keyboards, vocals
Sergei Antonov † - solo guitar

The modern Chelyabinsk formation of VIA "Ariel"

Rostislav Gepp - keyboards, flute, vocals - leader (from 1989 to the present)
Boris Kaplun - drums, violin, vocal
Alexander Tibelius - vocals, percussion
Oleg Gordeev - solo guitar, vocals

The modern Moscow formation of VIA "Ariel"

Valery Yarushin - bass guitar, vocals - leader (from 1989 to the present)
Alexander Trapeznikov - solo guitar, vocals
Victor Litvinov - keyboard, vocals
Anatoly Litvinov - drums, vocals

Discography
1975 — Ariel — S60-05891
1976 — Songs to the film "Mezhdu nebom i zemloy" — S60-07085-86
1978 — Russkiye kartinki — S60-08641
1978 — Skazaniye o Yemel'yane Pugachove — rok-opera
1980 — Na ostrove Buyane — S60-13891
1980 — Priglasheniye v gosti — C62-14857
1981 — Mastera — rok-oratoriya
1982 — Kazhdyy den tvoy — S60-16739
1983 — Utro planety, syuita — S60-20127 008
1985 — Za zemlyu Russkuyu — rok-duma
1990 — Lyubimaya, no chuzhaya — S60-31391 008 (Melodiya)
1993 — Privet (CD Krasniy Klin Music Records, Germaniya)
2000 — Shumel kamysh (CD)
2000 — Lyubimaya, no chuzhaya (CD)
2001 — Beatles in the russians (CD)
2001 — Cherez maydan (CD)
2005 — Doroga dlinoy v 35 (SD)
2008 — Ariel 40 (CD)
2011 — Vernomsya na ozora (SD)
2014 — Shumel kamysh (LP) PCRGLP002

References

External links
Official website
Yarushin's website

Russian folk rock groups
1970 establishments in Russia
Musical groups established in 1970
Pop-folk music groups